In probability and statistics, a random variate or simply variate is a particular outcome of a random variable: the random variates which are other outcomes of the same random variable might have different values (random numbers). 
A random deviate or simply deviate is the difference of random variate with respect to the distribution central location (e.g., mean), often divided by the standard deviation of the distribution (i.e., as a standard score).

Random variates are used when simulating processes driven by random influences (stochastic processes). In modern applications, such simulations would derive random variates corresponding to any given probability distribution from computer procedures designed to create random variates corresponding to a uniform distribution, where these procedures would actually provide values chosen from a uniform distribution of pseudorandom numbers.

Procedures to generate random variates corresponding to a given distribution are known as procedures for (uniform) random number generation or non-uniform pseudo-random variate generation.

In probability theory, a random variable is a measurable function from a probability space to a measurable space of values that the variable can take on. In that context, those values are also known as random variates or random deviates, and this represents a wider meaning than just that associated with pseudorandom numbers.

Definition

Devroye defines a random variate generation algorithm (for real numbers) as follows:

Assume that
 Computers can manipulate real numbers.
 Computers have access to a source of random variates that are uniformly distributed on the closed interval [0,1].
Then a random variate generation algorithm is any program that halts almost surely and exits with a real number x. This x is called a random variate.

(Both assumptions are violated in most real computers. Computers necessarily lack the ability to manipulate real numbers, typically using floating point representations instead. Most computers lack a source of true randomness (like certain hardware random number generators), and instead use pseudorandom number sequences.)

The distinction between random variable and random variate is subtle and is not always made in the literature. It is useful when one wants to distinguish between a random variable itself with an associated probability distribution on the one hand, and random draws from that probability distribution on the other, in particular when those draws are ultimately derived by floating-point arithmetic from a pseudo-random sequence.

Practical aspects

For the generation of uniform random variates, see Random number generation.

For the generation of non-uniform random variates, see Pseudo-random number sampling.

See also
Deviation (statistics)
Raw score

References

Statistical randomness